HKKF may stand for:

 Hong Kong & Kowloon Ferry, ferry company in Hong Kong
 Army Privates' and Corporals' Association, Danish trade union